Eoscaphandridae is a family of gastropods belonging to the order Cephalaspidea.

Genera:
 Eoscaphander Habe, 1952
 Pseudocylichna Chaban & Kijashko, 2016

References

Gastropods